Deiveson Alcântara Figueiredo (born December 18, 1987) is a Brazilian professional mixed martial artist. He currently competes in the Flyweight division of the Ultimate Fighting Championship (UFC), where he is a former two-time UFC Flyweight Champion. As of February 14, 2023, he is #1 in the UFC flyweight rankings.

Background 
Figueiredo was born in Soure, Pará, Brazil, a small city on the isle of Marajó where buffaloes roam freely. His father was a buffalo herder who practiced luta marajoara, a local folk wrestling style. Deiveson has a younger sister and a brother – Francisco – who also is a professional mixed martial artist signed with the UFC. He was a cowboy, working with his father at an animal farm until he was thirteen years old. Around the age of nine, he followed his father's footsteps and began wrestling. He moved to Belém to attend high school and started training in capoeira. He started training MMA under the tutelage of UFC Bantamweight Iuri "Marajó" Alcântara at the age of sixteen.

Mixed martial arts career

Early career 
Figueiredo made his professional debut in February 2012 against a fellow debutante Aluisio Ferreira. He won the fight by first-round submission. In his next six fights, Figueiredo  fought in the Pará and Maranhão MMA circuits, mostly against debuting fighters, with David Silva and Joel Silva being the notable exceptions.

In late 2014, Deiveson signed with Jungle Fight, and was scheduled to make his first appearance with the organization at Jungle Fight 75 against Rayner Silva. Figueiredo won the fight by a second-round TKO.

He was then scheduled to fight Jefte Brilhante during Revelation FC 3, but the bout was later cancelled. He was scheduled to fight Henrique Souza during Revelation FC 4, but the fight was likewise later cancelled.

Figueiredo was scheduled to fight Antônio de Miranda during Jungle Fight 87, following a seventeen-month break from the sport. He defeated de Miranda by submission mid-way through the first round. He fought again four months later, during Jungle Fight 90, against the undefeated Denis Araujo Oliveira. He defeated Araujo by a second-round TKO.

Ultimate Fighting Championship 
Figueiredo made his promotional debut on June 3, 2017, at UFC 212, facing Marco Beltran. He won the fight via technical knockout by corner stoppage after round two.

His next fight came on October 28, 2017, at UFC Fight Night: Brunson vs. Machida against Jarred Brooks. He won the fight via split decision.

On February 3, 2018, Figueiredo faced Joseph Morales at UFC Fight Night: Machida vs. Anders. He won the fight via technical knockout in round two.

Figueiredo faced John Moraga on August 25, 2018, at UFC Fight Night 135. He won the fight via technical knockout 3:08 into the second round.

Figueiredo was expected to face Joseph Benavidez on January 19, 2019, at UFC Fight Night 143. However the promotion clarified plans indicating that the pairing was off and that Figueiredo would be rescheduled for a separate event.

Figueiredo faced Jussier Formiga on March 23, 2019, at UFC Fight Night 148. He lost the fight via unanimous decision, thus resulting in Figueiredo's first professional loss.

Figueiredo faced Alexandre Pantoja on July 27, 2019, at UFC 240. He won the fight via unanimous decision. This fight earned him the Fight of the Night award.

Figueiredo faced Tim Elliott on October 12, 2019, at UFC Fight Night 161. He won the fight via submission in the first round.

UFC Flyweight Champion 
Figueiredo faced Joseph Benavidez for the vacant UFC Flyweight Championship at UFC Fight Night 169 on February 29, 2020. At the weigh-in, Figueiredo weighed in at 127.5 pounds, 2.5 pounds over the title fight limit. As a result, Figueiredo forfeited 30 percent of his purse to Benavidez and wasn't eligible to win the UFC Flyweight championship. He won the fight via TKO in round two.

Figueiredo rematched with Joseph Benavidez for the vacant UFC Flyweight Championship at UFC Fight Night 172 on July 19, 2020. On July 11, 2020, Figueiredo tested positive for COVID-19. According to his manager, the bout was not yet officially removed and Figueiredo was administered a second COVID-19 test on July 12, 2020, where the result would be back on July 13, 2020, to determined if Figueiredo was free to fight. Figueiredo passed multiple COVID-19 tests, clearing him to fight in the main event. Figueiredo won the fight via a technical submission in the first round. This win earned him the Performance of the Night award.

As the first fight of his new six-fight contract with the UFC, Figueiredo was scheduled to make his first title defense against former UFC Bantamweight champion Cody Garbrandt on November 21, 2020, at UFC 255. However, it was reported on October 2, 2020, that Garbrandt had torn his bicep and was forced to pull out of the contest. Figueiredo instead made his first title defense against Alex Perez. He won the fight via guillotine choke submission in round one.

After a successful defence of his title at UFC 255, Figueiredo faced Brandon Moreno at UFC 256. This was the UFC's fastest championship turnaround, at 21 days. After five rounds of back-and-forth fighting, the fight was declared a majority draw. Figueiredo had a point taken from him by referee Jason Herzog in the third round for a low blow: the foul proved crucial as it turned two 48-47 scorecards in his favor into even 47-47 decisions, with the third judge seeing the fight 48-46 for the champion. Both men won the Fight of the Night award.

Title loss
Figueiredo then faced Moreno in a rematch on June 12, 2021, at UFC 263.  He lost the bout and the title via a rear-naked choke submission in round three.

Second UFC Flyweight Championship reign
A trilogy bout with Moreno for the UFC Flyweight Championship was scheduled on December 11, 2021, at UFC 269 initially, but it was moved to UFC 270. Figueiredo trained with Henry Cejudo at Fight Ready to prepare for the fight. After knocking Moreno down multiple times, he won the bout via unanimous decision, becoming a two time UFC Flyweight champion in the process. This fight earned him the Fight of the Night award.

The tetralogy bout between Figueiredo and Brandon Moreno took place on January 21, 2023, at UFC 283. He lost the bout and title via technical knockout before the fourth round after the ringside doctor stopped the fight due to Figueiredo's eye swelling shut. Figueiredo announced his intentions to move up to bantamweight after the fight, citing difficulty cutting weight to make flyweight.

Personal life
Figueiredo worked as a bricklayer, hairdresser, and sushi chef before competing in MMA professionally.

He is a fan of Brazilian football teams Botafogo and Paysandu.

Following a stint at Team Alpha Male, Deiveson returned to his native Brazil and founded Team Figueiredo gym in Belém.

Championships and accomplishments

Mixed martial arts
 Ultimate Fighting Championship
 UFC Flyweight Championship (two times)
 Two successful title defenses (first reign)
 Fight of the Night (Three times) }
 Performance of the Night (One time) 
 Tied for most finishes in Flyweight division (7) (w. Demetrious Johnson)
 Fastest submission in Flyweight division history (1:57) (vs. Alex Perez)
2020 Fighter of the Year
Shortest span between a trilogy in UFC history (406 days)
The only trilogy in UFC history consisting of both fighters' three consecutive bouts
 MMAJunkie.com
 2019 July Fight of the Month 
 2020 December Fight of the Month 
2022 January Fight of the Month 
MMA Mania
2020 Fight of the Year vs. Brandon Moreno
2020 Fighter of the Year
The Athletic
2020 Fighter of the Year
MMA Fighting
2020 Fighter of the Year
Combat Press
2020 Male Fighter of the Year
Sherdog
2020 Fighter of the Year
The Body Lock MMA
2020 Male Fighter of the Year
World MMA Awards
2021 Fight of the Year vs. Brandon Moreno at UFC 256

Grappling
'''Brazilian jiu-jitsu
 Brazilian Jiu-jitsu Northeast Brazil champion

Mixed martial arts record 

|-
|Loss
|align=center|21–3–1
|Brandon Moreno
|TKO (doctor stoppage)
|UFC 283
|
|align=center|3
|align=center|5:00
|Rio de Janeiro, Brazil
|
|-
|Win
|align=center|21–2–1
|Brandon Moreno
|Decision (unanimous)
|UFC 270
|
|align=center|5
|align=center|5:00
|Anaheim, California, United States
|
|-
|Loss
|align=center|
|Brandon Moreno
|Submission (rear-naked choke)
|UFC 263
|
|align=center|3
|align=center|2:26
|Glendale, Arizona, United States
|
|-
|Draw
|align=center|20–1–1
|Brandon Moreno
|Draw (majority)
|UFC 256
|
|align=center|5
|align=center|5:00
|Las Vegas, Nevada, United States
|
|-
|Win
|align=center|20–1
|Alex Perez 
|Submission (guillotine choke)
|UFC 255
|
|align=center|1
|align=center|1:57
|Las Vegas, Nevada, United States
|
|-
|Win
|align=center|19–1
|Joseph Benavidez
| Technical Submission (rear-naked choke)
|UFC Fight Night: Figueiredo vs. Benavidez 2 
|
|align=center|1
|align=center|4:48
|Abu Dhabi, United Arab Emirates
|
|-
|Win
|align=center|18–1
|Joseph Benavidez
|TKO (punches) 
|UFC Fight Night: Benavidez vs. Figueiredo 
|
|align=center|2
|align=center|1:54
|Norfolk, Virginia, United States
|
|-
|Win
|align=center|17–1
|Tim Elliott
|Submission (guillotine choke)
|UFC Fight Night: Joanna vs. Waterson 
|
|align=center|1
|align=center|3:08
|Tampa, Florida, United States
|
|-
|Win
|align=center|16–1
|Alexandre Pantoja
|Decision (unanimous)
|UFC 240 
|
|align=center|3
|align=center|5:00
|Edmonton, Alberta, Canada
|
|-
|Loss
|align=center|15–1
|Jussier Formiga
|Decision (unanimous)
|UFC Fight Night: Thompson vs. Pettis 
|
|align=center|3
|align=center|5:00
|Nashville, Tennessee, United States
|
|- 
|Win
|align=center|15–0
|John Moraga
|TKO (punches)
|UFC Fight Night: Gaethje vs. Vick 
|
|align=center|2
|align=center|3:08
|Lincoln, Nebraska, United States
|
|-
|Win
|align=center|14–0
|Joseph Morales
|TKO (punches)
|UFC Fight Night: Machida vs. Anders
|
|align=center|2
|align=center|4:34
|Belém, Brazil
|
|-
|Win
|align=center|13–0
|Jarred Brooks
|Decision (split)
|UFC Fight Night: Brunson vs. Machida
|
|align=center|3
|align=center|5:00
|São Paulo, Brazil
|
|-
|Win
|align=center|12–0
|Marco Beltrán
|TKO (corner stoppage)
|UFC 212
|
|align=center|2
|align=center|5:00
|Rio de Janeiro, Brazil
|
|-
|Win
|align=center|11–0
|Ricardo do Socorro 
|Submission (arm-triangle choke)
|Salvaterra Marajó Fight 5
|
|align=center|1
|align=center|1:20
|Salvaterra, Brazil
|
|-
|Win
|align=center|10–0
|Denis Oliveira Fontes Araujo
|KO (punches)
|Jungle Fight 90
|
|align=center|2
|align=center|2:56
|São Paulo, Brazil
|
|-
|Win
|align=center|9–0
|Antônio de Miranda
|Submission (guillotine choke)
|Jungle Fight 87
|
|align=center|1
|align=center|2:55
|São Paulo, Brazil
|
|-
|Win
|align=center|8–0
|Rayner Silva
|TKO (punches)
|Jungle Fight 75
|
|align=center|2
|align=center|3:20
|Belém, Brazil
|
|-
|Win
|align=center|7–0
|João Neto Silva
|TKO (punches)
|Coalizao Fight 4
|
|align=center|1
|align=center|2:18
|Benevides, Brazil
|
|-
|Win
|align=center|6–0
|Joel Silva
|KO (punches)
|Coalizao Fight Night
|
|align=center|1
|align=center|3:30
|Belém, Brazil
|
|-
|Win
|align=center|5–0
|Edvaldo Junior
|Submission (guillotine choke)
|Jurunense Open Fight MMA 8
|
|align=center|1
|align=center|4:55
|Belém, Brazil
|
|-
|Win
|align=center|4–0
|Adailton Pereira
|Decision (unanimous)
|Lago da Pedra Fight
|
|align=center|3
|align=center|5:00
|Lago da Pedra, Brazil
|
|-
|Win
|align=center|3–0
|David Raimundo Silva
|Submission (guillotine choke)
|Jurunense Open Fight MMA 7
|
|align=center|1
|align=center|0:53
|Belém, Brazil
|
|-
|Win
|align=center|2–0
|Jonas Ferreira 
|TKO (punches)
|Amazon Fight 18: Santa Izabel
|
|align=center|1
|align=center|2:04
|Santa Isabel do Pará, Brazil
|
|-
|Win
|align=center|1–0
|Aluisio Ferreira
|Submission (armbar)
|Knock Out Combat Icoaraci 3
|
|align=center|1
|align=center|3:02
|Belém, Brazil
|
|-

See also 
 List of current UFC fighters
 List of male mixed martial artists

References

External links
 
 

1987 births
Living people
Brazilian male mixed martial artists
Flyweight mixed martial artists
Mixed martial artists utilizing capoeira
Mixed martial artists utilizing wrestling
Mixed martial artists utilizing Brazilian jiu-jitsu
Sportspeople from Pará
Brazilian capoeira practitioners
Brazilian practitioners of Brazilian jiu-jitsu
People awarded a black belt in Brazilian jiu-jitsu
Ultimate Fighting Championship male fighters
Ultimate Fighting Championship champions